"P.F. Sloan" is a song written by singer-songwriter Jimmy Webb about his contemporary, P. F. Sloan. It first appeared on Webb's solo debut album Words and Music in 1970. He also rerecorded it on his 1977 album El Mirage. 

British female singer-songwriter Rumer has also recorded it, and it was released as the lead single from her second studio album, Boys Don't Cry, on May 4, 2012.

Rumer version

Music video
A music video to accompany the release of Rumer's version was first released onto YouTube on May 22, 2012 at a total length of four minutes and seventeen seconds.

Track listings

Chart performance

Release history

References

Songs about musicians
Cultural depictions of pop musicians
Cultural depictions of folk musicians
Cultural depictions of American men
2012 singles
Rumer (musician) songs
The Association songs
1971 songs
Songs written by Jimmy Webb
Atlantic Records singles